The Dirtiest Thirstiest is the only studio album by American rapper Yung Wun. The album reached #50 in Billboard's chart of 'R&B Albums' and #11 in its list of Top Heatseekers.	

The album included the rapper's biggest single to date, "Tear It Up", which peaked at #76 on the Billboard Hot 100. The song features prominent rappers DMX, Lil’ Flip and David Banner and involves a dramatic, marching-band beat.

Track listing

Samples
"Tear It Up"
"Dancing Machine" by The Jackson 5 (uncredited)
Drumline in which the above sample was taken from because their version of Dancing Machine was performed in a medley
"Yung Wun Anthem"
The Munsters Theme" by Jack Marshall (uncredited)
"One More Day In The Hood"
"Ships Ahoy!" by The O'Jays

References

2004 debut albums
Full Surface Records albums
J Records albums
Southern hip hop albums
Albums produced by Bangladesh (record producer)
Albums produced by David Banner
Albums produced by Swizz Beatz